is a Japanese animator and director born in Kawasaki, Kanagawa. He got his start at Ashi Productions and has worked as a key animator and animation director, as well as episode director for many projects. In recent years, he has worked as a sound director and screenwriter for some of the works. Initially, the OVA Pinky:St was supposed to be his first directorial work, but due to production delays, the TV series MÄR was aired before it, resulting in it being his first directorial work instead. He is a quick worker and often directs two or three projects at a time. He also does much of the storyboarding himself. He enjoys collecting figurines and character goods, and his work desk is crammed with toys. He got into the anime industry because he dreamed of working on plastic models and toyetic anime.

Filmography

TV series
MÄR (2006–2007) - Director (eps 53-102)
Moetan (2007) - Director
Getsumento Heiki Mina (2007) - Director
Hayate the Combat Butler (2007–2008) - Director
Psychic Squad (2008–2009) - Director
Nyan Koi! (2009) - Director
Sket Dance (2011–2012) - Director
Mayo Chiki! (2011) - Director
OniAi (2012) - Director
Minami-ke: Tadaima (2013) - Director
Dragon Collection (2014–2015) - Director
Jinsei (2014) - Director
Million Doll (2015) - Director
Phantasy Star Online 2: The Animation (2016) - Director
Please Tell Me! Galko-chan (2016) - Director, Series Composition
Nurse Witch Komugi R (2016) - Director
Frame Arms Girl (2017) - Director
Island (2018) - Director
Mr. Tonegawa: Middle Management Blues (2018) - Director
Shadowverse (2020–2021) - Director
Higurashi: When They Cry – Gou (2020–2021) - Director
Dropout Idol Fruit Tart (2020) - Director, Series Composition
Higurashi: When They Cry – Sotsu (2021) - Director
Shadowverse Flame (2022) - Director
The Prince of Tennis II: U-17 World Cup (2022) - Director
Spy Classroom (2023) - Director
Hero Classroom (2023) - Director

OVAs/ONAs
Pinky:St (2006) - Director
The Idolmaster Live For You! (2008) - Director
Kowarekake no Orgel (2009) - Director
Yutori-chan (2009–2010) - Director
Psychic Squad (2010) - Director
Princess Resurrection (2010–2011) - Director
Mei-elle Otoko no Ko (2010) - Director
Kantan Pacemaker Nyūmon (2010) - Director
Minami-ke: Omatase (2012) - Director
Rescue Me! (2013) - Director
Minami-ke: Natsuyasumi (2013) - Director
The Prince of Tennis: Best Games!! (2018–present) - Director
The Prince of Tennis: Hyotei vs. Rikkai Game of Future (2021) - Director

Films
Kowarekake no Orgel (2010) - Director
Hunter × Hunter: The Last Mission (2013) - Director
Frame Arms Girl: Kyakkyau Fufu na Wonderland (2019) - Director

References

See also

Anime directors
Living people
People from Kawasaki, Kanagawa
Year of birth missing (living people)